is Japan's largest homebuilder, specializing in prefabricated houses. The company is also engaged in the construction of factories, shopping centers, health care facilities, the management and operation of resort hotels, golf courses and fitness clubs. Daiwa House also operates as a sales agency for HAL robot suits.

Daiwa House is also one of Japan's largest owner and operator of freight logistics centers, with over 250 logistics properties under management, and further expansion planned in this business segment.

The company was founded in 1955 in Osaka and is listed on the Tokyo Stock Exchange and Osaka Securities Exchange, being a constituent of the TOPIX and Nikkei 225 stock indices.

In 2012, the Scout Association of Japan received a donation of a large forest of approximately 2.7 square kilometers in Takahagi, Ibaraki Prefecture from Daiwa. Permanent facilities include an Administrative Building with accommodations for 44 people, dining room/kitchen, meeting room, training room; an outdoor auditorium of 200 m² that seats about 100 people; a tent campsite with accommodations for about 800 people and about 50 campfire places available; a communal plaza (Hiroba 広場), and an outdoor arena stage.

Gallery

References

External links 
  
  
  Wiki collection of bibliographic works on Daiwa House

Real estate companies established in 1955
Construction and civil engineering companies based in Tokyo
Manufacturing companies based in Tokyo
Real estate companies based in Tokyo
Companies based in Osaka Prefecture
Companies based in Osaka
Companies listed on the Tokyo Stock Exchange
Companies listed on the Osaka Exchange
Construction and civil engineering companies established in 1955
Japanese companies established in 1955